Wachtum is a village located in the municipality of Coevorden, within the Dutch province of Drenthe.

History 
The village was first mentioned between 1381 and 1383 "to Wachtman". The etymology is unknown. Wachtum is an esdorp without a church which developed in the Early Middle Ages on a sandy ridge.

The village is home to a windmill, which its villagers refer to as De Hoop. Originally, it was built as a drainage mill for a polder in Veendam, Groningen. In 1894 it was moved to Wachtum where the villagers began utilizing it to produce animal feed.

Wachtum was home to 338 people in 1840.

References

External links
 
   Official website of Wachtum

Coevorden
Populated places in Drenthe